In geometry, the pentagonal bipyramid (or dipyramid) is third of the infinite set of face-transitive bipyramids, and the 13th Johnson solid. Each bipyramid is the dual of a uniform prism.

Although it is face-transitive, it is not a Platonic solid because some vertices have four faces meeting and others have five faces.

Properties
If the faces are equilateral triangles, it is a deltahedron and a Johnson solid (J13). It can be seen as two pentagonal pyramids (J2) connected by their bases. 

The pentagonal dipyramid is 4-connected, meaning that it takes the removal of four vertices to disconnect the remaining vertices. It is one of only four 4-connected simplicial well-covered polyhedra, meaning that all of the maximal independent sets of its vertices have the same size. The other three polyhedra with this property are the regular octahedron, the snub disphenoid, and an irregular polyhedron with 12 vertices and 20 triangular faces.

Formulae 

The following formulae for the height, surface area and volume can be used if all faces are regular, with edge length :

Related polyhedra 

The pentagonal bipyramid, dt{2,5}, can be in sequence rectified, rdt{2,5}, truncated, {2,5} and alternated (snubbed), {2,5}:

The dual of the Johnson solid pentagonal bipyramid is the pentagonal prism, with 7 faces: 5 rectangular faces and 2 pentagons.

See also
 Pentagonal bipyramidal molecular geometry

References

External links
 
Conway Notation for Polyhedra Try: dP5

Johnson solids
Deltahedra
Pyramids and bipyramids